Rastra Gaurav Man Padavi (Order of the National Pride) is the second highest civilian award of the Nepal. Instituted in 2010, the award is conferred for contribution to the nation.

History 

Order of Tri Shakti Patta was instituted by King Tribhuvan of Nepal in on 27 November 1937. It had 5 classes plus a medal. First Class was Jyotirmaya-Subikhyat-Tri-Shakti-Patta, Second Class was Subikhyat-Tri-Shakti-Patta, Third Class was Bikhyat-Tri-Shakti-Patta, Fourth Class was Prakhyat-Tri-Shakti-Patta, Fifth Class was Tri-Shakti-Patta and there was a medal Tri-Shakti-Patta-Padak.

After the end of monarchy in 2008, the new government introduced a new series of awards. "Nepal Ratna Man Padavi" is the highest class whereas Rastra Gaurav Man Padavi is second highest. The award is conferred by the President of Nepal on the Republic Day, 29 May.

Recipients

References 

Orders, decorations, and medals of Nepal
Civil awards and decorations of Nepal
2010 establishments in Nepal